Theodor Stroefer, or Ströfer (27 March 1843, in Bad Pyrmont – 9 July 1927, in Nuremberg) was a German publisher; specializing in illustrated books.

Biography 
Then he was sent to New York City in 1866 to set up a commercial agency on Broadway. There, he imported and exported pictures, creating illustrated books and albums from engravings and photographs. In 1871 he teamed up with Georg Kirchner, who had emigrated from Frankfurt an der Oder; starting a publishing firm called "Stroefer & Kirchner".

In 1876, he returned to Germany and opened a branch office in Munich. One of his first projects was a new edition of Viola Tricolor, a collection of art and poetry by Franz Graf von Pocci. The following year, their company split into two divisions, with Stroefer operating "Theo. Stroefer’s Kunstverlag", dealing exclusively with Europe, and Kirchner operating "Geo. Kirchner & Co.", for North America.

In 1893, he relocated his company's headquarters to Nuremberg and began a close collaboration with the Kunstanstalt für graphische Reproductionen, owned by Ernest Nister, creator of the modern pop-up book.

After his death, his son August (1882-1945), took over the company. During World War II, their offices and publishing archives were completely destroyed. In 1958, the company was officially deleted from the German Handelsregister.

Theo. Stroefer’s Kunstverlag 
His interests were wide-ranging.

A large part of his output consisted of children's picture books, often with illustrations chosen by Nister. The year 1880 saw the introduction of works by Kate Greenaway, including her now-classic Under the Window, translated by Käthe Freiligrath-Kroeker, daughter of the poet, Ferdinand Freiligrath. By the 1900s, he had effectively become a children's book publisher.

He was also the first to publish etchings by Max Klinger, issuing Intermezzi (Opus IV) in 1881.

References

Further reading 
 Stephanie Schilling: Der Kinderbuchverleger Theodor Stroefer. Verlagsgeschichte und Analyse der Verlagsproduktion. MA-Arbeit, Erlangen (Ms. masch.) 1987.
 Eva Klose: "Künstler- und Bildpostkarten für Ungarn im Kunstverlag Theodor Stroefer." In: Christa Pieske, Konrad Vanja, Sigrid Nagy (Eds.): Tagungsband Budapest 2003. (Arbeitskreis Bild Druck Papier, Vol. 8) Waxmann 2004, pgs.135–140.
 Eva Klose: "Die Zusammenarbeit der Kunstverlage Theo. Stroefer und Ernst Nister in Nürnberg." In: Wolfgang Brückner, Konrad Vanja, Detlef Lorenz, Alberto Milano, Sigrid Nagy (Eds.): Arbeitskreis Bild Druck Papier – Tagungsband Nürnberg 2009. (Arbeitskreis Bild Druck Papier, Vol. 14) Waxmann 2010, .

External links 

1843 births
1927 deaths
German publishers (people)
Children's book publishers
People from Bad Pyrmont